Skinners Gap is a mountain pass in the U.S. state of West Virginia.

Skinners Gap most likely was named after a local pioneer settler.

References

Landforms of Berkeley County, West Virginia
Mountain passes of West Virginia